Casting Sport was part of all World Games until 2005 except in 1989. It was then dropped as the International World Games Association wants the International Casting Sport Federation to come up with new and improved event formats.

Medalists

Men

Fly Accuracy

Fly Distance Single Handed

Fly Distance Double Handed

Spinning Accuracy Arenberg Target

Spinning Accuracy

Spinning Distance Single Handed

Spinning Distance Double Handed

Multiplier Accuracy

Multiplier Distance Single Handed

Multiplier Distance Double Handed

All-round (Combination #1-10)

Women

Fly Accuracy

Fly Distance Single Handed

Spinning Accuracy Arenberg Target

Spinning Accuracy

Spinning Distance Single Handed

Multiplier Accuracy

References

External links
International Tournament Rules for Castingsport
World Games at Sports123 by Internet Archive
2005 World Games info system

 
Sports at the World Games
Casting